Chromatogenys is an extinct genus of Scincomorph lizard from the Santonian of Hungary, containing the species C. tiliquoides. It is known from the Csehbánya Formation with the remains consisting of a partial right mandible, the name coming from the vibrant colours on the preserved specimen. The dentition is durophagous, and the animal likely ate hard shelled prey.

References 

Scincomorpha
Prehistoric reptile genera
Santonian life
Late Cretaceous lepidosaurs of Europe
Fossils of Hungary
Fossil taxa described in 2015